Panama Wedding is an American synthpop band based in New York City. The four-piece band is fronted by its lead singer and songwriter, Peter Kirk. Originally from Sea Cliff, New York, Kirk grew up recording music in his bedroom, although it wasn't until he rented studio space in Manhattan that he began to seriously write music. Initially, Kirk spent several years performing his electronic and computer-based pop as a solo act before expanding Panama Wedding into a full ensemble with a rhythm section.

In 2014, the band released a reworked version of their song "All of the People." The online popularity of the song, as well as a series of successful appearances at CMJ, helped broaden the band's profile and they quickly signed to Glassnote Records. In 2014, Panama Wedding released their debut EP, Parallel Play. The album charted at number 22 on the Billboard Top Heatseekers chart.

The band made their live television debut performing their song "All of the People" and "Uma" on Jimmy Kimmel Live on September 10, 2014.

Panama Wedding has toured with several artists including St. Lucia, Magic Man, Smallpools, Dan Croll, and RAC.

2015 Fall Tour 
On October 9 tickets went on sale for shows in seven major U.S. cities including sold-out shows in Boston, New York City (Bowery Ballroom), Washington D.C., and Chicago. Great Good Fine Ok was announced as the opening act during all shows except for the December 2nd show in Philadelphia.

2016 Spring Tour - Present 
In the spring of 2016, Panama Wedding went on a 28 city tour with Magic Man & The Griswolds. Afterwards, Panama Wedding played several summer festivals including Mo Pop in Detroit and Lollapalooza. Panama Wedding is currently in the studio recording their debut full-length release.

Discography

Extended plays

Singles

References

External links
 Official page on Bandcamp

Alternative dance musical groups
Alternative rock groups from New York (state)
Indie pop groups from New York (state)
Musical groups established in 2013
Glassnote Records artists
2013 establishments in New York City